Vitaliy Mykolayovych Shubin (born 1982) is a Ukrainian lawyer and civil servant. On 10 March 2020, he was appointed as the Acting Minister of Energy and Environmental Protection.

Biography 
In 2004, he graduated from Kyiv University of Tourism, Economics and Law. In 2011, he graduated from the National Academy for Public Administration under the President of Ukraine.

Shubin was a specialist at DTEK. Since February 2018, he served as director of Dnipro-Bug Wind Farm LLC.

From October 2019 to April 2020, Shubin worked as First Deputy Minister of Energy and Environmental Protection.

He is a member of the supervisory board of Ukrhydroenergo.

See also 
 Shmyhal Government

References

External links 
 

1982 births
Living people
21st-century Ukrainian lawyers
21st-century Ukrainian politicians
Independent politicians in Ukraine
Kyiv University of Tourism, Economics, and Law alumni
National Academy of State Administration alumni
Ministers of Energy of Ukraine
Preservation of natural environment ministers of Ukraine
Ukrainian civil servants